van Herck is Flemish or Dutch surname. Notable people with the surname include:

Edmond Van Herck (1913–2007), Belgian rower
Jacob Melchior van Herck (active in Antwerp 1691–1735), Flemish still life painter 
Johan Van Herck (born 1974), Belgian tennis player
Paul van Herck (1938–1989), Belgian writer
Wilfried Van Herck (born 1946), Belgian rower

See also
Glen D. VanHerck (born 1962), American general

Surnames of Dutch origin